Kin Kora is a suburb of Gladstone in the Gladstone Region, Queensland, Australia. In the  Kin Kora had a population of 2,582 people.

History
The suburb takes its name from Kin Kora Creek, which was in turn named in about 1853 by Dublin-born surveyor Francis Peter MacCabe with the traditional Irish name for the stronghold of the King of Ireland, Brian Boru.

Kin Kora State School  opened on 9 October 1981.

In the 2011 census, Kin Kora had a population of 2,686 people.

In the  Kin Kora had a population of 2,582 people.

The  revealed that the population of Kin Kora was 2,396 people.

Education
Kin Kora State School is a government primary (Prep-6) school for boys and girls at 43 Hibiscus Avenue. In 2013, the school had 873 students with 55 teachers (49 full-time equivalent). In 2018, the school had an enrolment of 771 students with 58 teachers (50 full-time equivalent) and 24 non-teaching staff (17 full-time equivalent). It includes a special education program.

There is no secondary school in Kin Kora. The nearest secondary school is Toolooa State High School in South Gladstone to the north-east.

Amenities
The Windmill Centre is a shopping centre at 216-226 Philip Street.

Kin Kora C & K Community Kindergarten is at 84 Sun Valley Road adjacent to the Kin Kora State School.

Gladstone Golf Club is an 18-hole golf course at 1 Hickory Avenue.

There are a number of parks in the area, including:

 Cypress Way Park
 Maroona Park

 Toonee Park

References

External links
 

Suburbs of Gladstone